Karol Wilhelm Szenajch (also known as Schöneich, 11 February 1907 in Warsaw - 1 August 2001 in Montreal) was a Polish ice hockey player who competed in the 1928 Winter Olympics.

In 1928 he participated with the Polish ice hockey team in the Olympic tournament. At the onset of World War II he emigrated to Montreal, Quebec, where he died.

References

External links
 Olympic ice hockey tournament 1928 
 Karol Szenajch's profile at Sports Reference.com
 

1907 births
2001 deaths
Polish ice hockey centres
Olympic ice hockey players of Poland
Ice hockey players at the 1928 Winter Olympics
Legia Warsaw (ice hockey) players
Sportspeople from Warsaw
People from Warsaw Governorate
Polish emigrants to Canada